The Panopeidae are a family containing 26 genera of morphologically similar crabs, often known as "mud crabs". Their centers of diversity are the Atlantic Ocean and eastern Pacific Ocean.

Distribution
Most members of the family Panopeidae live in the Atlantic Ocean or eastern Pacific Ocean. Only one species occurs in Australian waters – Homoioplax haswelli.

Ecology
The various genera of the Panopeidae are morphologically similar, partly as a result of many instances of convergent evolution to similar habitats and food preferences.

Crabs of the family Panopeidae are all free-living (not commensal or parasitic), and typically live in soft-bottomed parts of the ocean, lending them the common name "mud crabs" (a name also shared by other organisms). They burrow into the sediment and feed on a variety of marine invertebrates.

Genera
The World Register of Marine Species lists these subfamilies and genera:

Eucratopsinae Stimpson, 1871

Panopeinae Ortmann, 1893

References

Xanthoidea
Decapod families